She Made Her Bed is a 1934 American pre-Code romantic drama film directed by Ralph Murphy and written by James M. Cain, Casey Robinson and Frank R. Adams. The film stars Richard Arlen, Sally Eilers, Robert Armstrong, Grace Bradley, Roscoe Ates and Charley Grapewin. It was released on March 9, 1934, by Paramount Pictures.

Plot

Cast 
Richard Arlen as Wild Bill Smith
Sally Eilers as Laura Gordon
Robert Armstrong as 'Duke' Gordon
Grace Bradley as Eve Richards
Roscoe Ates as Santa Fe
Charley Grapewin as Joe Olesen

References

External links
 
 
 

1934 films
1930s romantic comedy-drama films
Adultery in films
American black-and-white films
American romantic comedy-drama films
Circus films
Films based on short fiction
Films based on works by James M. Cain
Films directed by Ralph Murphy
Paramount Pictures films
1934 comedy films
1934 drama films
1930s English-language films
1930s American films